Elkeson de Oliveira Cardoso (born 13 July 1989), known as Elkeson or Ai Kesen, is a professional footballer who plays as an attacking midfielder or forward. Born in Brazil, he represents the China national team.

Starting out at Vitória, he played mostly as an attacking midfielder and as a winger, but since his final days at Botafogo, he was moved to attack and has played as a striker. Born in Brazil, Elkeson obtained Chinese citizenship in 2019 through naturalization and represents China internationally.

Club career

Brazil
Elkeson first played for Vitória's youth academy before signing with the first team in 2009. During the 2010 season, Elkeson proved himself a breakout success and soon earned himself a move to Botafogo in May 2011.

After two years of being one of Botafogo's star players in the Brasileirão, Guangzhou Evergrande of the Chinese Super League secured his services at the end of the 2012 season.

Guangzhou Evergrande
On 24 December 2012, Guangzhou Evergrande officially announced that they had signed Elkeson on a four-year deal for a fee of €5.7 million. He was not initially included in Guangzhou's 30-player squad for the 2013 AFC Champions League due to the limit on foreign players. On 3 March 2013, he made his debut for Guangzhou in the 2013 Chinese FA Super Cup which Guangzhou Evergrande lost to Jiangsu Sainty 2–1. On 8 March 2013, Elkeson scored his first two goals in China in the opening match of the 2013 Chinese Super League against Shanghai Shenxin, which ensured Guangzhou Evergrande's 5–1 victory. He scored thirteen goals in his first seven matches in the league. In July 2013, Elkeson was named in the squad which was submitted for the next stage of the AFC Champions League, replacing Lucas Barrios, who had decided to return to Europe.

He scored twenty-four goals in twenty-eight appearances in the Super League which made him the top goalscorer of the season, eight more than the second-placed Carmelo Valencia. He scored six goals in six matches in the AFC Champions League, including two goals across both legs of the 2013 AFC Champions League Final against FC Seoul as Guangzhou was crowned champion of the competition for the first time. The win in the final was the first time a Chinese club had won the trophy in 23 years.

On 1 December 2013, in the first leg of the 2013 Chinese FA Cup final against Guizhou Renhe, he was sent off after striking Yang Hao in the face with his hand. On 5 December, he received a ban of 4 matches and was fined ¥20,000 by the Chinese Football Association discipline committee.

Guangzhou Evergrande finally lost to Guizhou Renhe 3–2 on aggregate, failing to defend the FA Cup title. Elkeson played all three matches for Guangzhou Evergrande in the 2013 FIFA Club World Cup. On 14 December 2013, he scored Guangzhou's first goal in the FIFA Club World Cup against African champions Al Ahly in the quarter-finals, helping Guangzhou win the match 2–0.

In March 2015, after a match against Changchun Yatai, he was heavily criticised for annulling teammate Gao Lin's certain bicycle kick goal by attempting to poach the goal for himself by just brushing the ball on the line with his head, which meant ultimately that the goal was (correctly) ruled offside and the team only drew the match 1–1.

Elkeson scored the winner as Guangzhou beat Al-Ahli of the UAE to win a second AFC Champions League in three years on 21 November 2015.

Shanghai SIPG
On 21 January 2016, Elkeson moved to fellow Super League side Shanghai SIPG with a fee of ¥132 million (€18.5 million).

On 4 April 2018, Elkeson scored his side's only goal in their 1–1 draw with Kawasaki Frontale in the group stage of the AFC Champions League. The goal was Elkeson's 27th in the competition proper, moving him to fourth all time in the top scoring charts.

On 18 September 2018, Elkeson scored the winning goal for Shanghai SIPG, as the club recorded its first ever win in the Super League against his former club Guangzhou Evergrande. The win cemented SIPG's position in first place at the top of the league table. On 7 October, Elkeson scored again as SIPG recorded a 5–0 win over bottom-of-the-table Guizhou Hengfeng to extend their lead over his former club at the top of the table to 4 points with just over a month of the season left. On 7 November, Elkeson played a part in Shanghai's 2–0 win over Beijing Renhe in the penultimate round of fixtures. The win secured Shanghai SIPG's first Chinese Super League title and ended Guangzhou Evergrande's seven-year title reign.

Return to Guangzhou Evergrande
On 9 July 2019, Elkeson returned to his former club Guangzhou Evergrande. Elkeson reportedly agreed a €10 million (US$11.2 million) annual salary to return, up from €6 million in Shanghai. At the time of his transfer, the two clubs were level on points, and were two points behind leaders Beijing Guoan. Elkeson marked his return to Guangzhou with goals in his first two games, and a hat-trick against local rivals Guangzhou R&F in his third match on 20 July.

On 13 December 2021, Elkeson confirmed his departure from Guangzhou FC, having terminated his contract with the club by mutual consent.

Return to Brazil 
On 12 April 2022, Elkeson officially joined Série B side Grêmio, signing a contract until the end of the year and returning to Brazil after ten years abroad. Having scored four goals in 23 matches, he helped O Tricolor gain automatic promotion back to the Brazilian top tier at the end of the 2022 season. On 9 November, he announced his official departure from the club.

International career

In September 2011, Elkeson received his first call up for the Brazil national football team by Mano Menezes for the second leg of the 2011 Superclásico de las Américas against Argentina. However, he didn't play for Brazil in the match.

Elkeson was called up to the Chinese national team in August 2019, following the gaining of Chinese citizenship via naturalisation. Elkeson subsequently became the first player to be called up for China without any Chinese ancestry.

Following his naturalisation as a Chinese citizen, his name was rendered as Ai Kesen in Chinese. Prior to that, he used the Chinese transliterated name Ai Er'kesen; in Cantonese speaking areas such as Guangzhou and Hong Kong, he was known as Ngai Git-san.

Career statistics

Club

International
As of 30 May 2021. China score listed first, score column shows score after each Elkeson goal.

Honours
Vitória
 Campeonato Baiano: 2009, 2010
 Copa do Nordeste: 2010

Botafogo
 Taça Rio: 2012

Guangzhou Evergrande
 Chinese Super League: 2013, 2014, 2015, 2019
 AFC Champions League: 2013, 2015

Shanghai SIPG
 Chinese Super League: 2018
 Chinese FA Super Cup: 2019

Grêmio
Recopa Gaúcha: 2022

Brazil
 Superclásico de las Américas : 2011

Individual
 AFC Champions League Dream Team: 2013, 2014
 Chinese Football Association Footballer of the Year: 2014
 Chinese Super League Golden Boot: 2013, 2014
 Chinese Super League Team of the Year: 2013, 2014

See also 
List of Chinese naturalized footballers

References

External links

 
 Profile at IG Esporte website 

1989 births
Living people
Sportspeople from Maranhão
Chinese footballers
China international footballers
Brazilian footballers
Brazilian expatriate footballers
Esporte Clube Vitória players
Botafogo de Futebol e Regatas players
Grêmio Foot-Ball Porto Alegrense players
Guangzhou F.C. players
Shanghai Port F.C. players
Campeonato Brasileiro Série A players
Campeonato Brasileiro Série B players
Chinese Super League players
Brazilian emigrants to China
Association football forwards
Naturalized citizens of the People's Republic of China